Participation bias or non-response bias is a phenomenon in which the results of elections, studies, polls, etc. become non-representative because the participants disproportionately possess certain traits which affect the outcome. These traits mean the sample is systematically different from the target population, potentially resulting in biased estimates.

For instance, a study found that those who refused to answer a survey on AIDS tended to be "older, attend church more often, are less likely to believe in the confidentiality of surveys, and have lower sexual self disclosure." It may occur due to several factors as outlined in Deming (1990).

Non-response bias can be a problem in longitudinal research due to attrition during the study.

Example 
If one selects a sample of 1000 managers in a field and polls them about their workload, the managers with a high workload may not answer the survey because they do not have enough time to answer it, and/or those with a low workload may decline to respond for fear that their supervisors or colleagues will perceive them as surplus employees (either immediately, if the survey is non-anonymous, or in the future, should their anonymity be compromised). Therefore, non-response bias may make the measured value for the workload too low, too high, or, if the effects of the above biases happen to offset each other, "right for the wrong reasons."  For a simple example of this effect, consider a survey that includes, "Agree or disagree: I have enough time in my day to complete a survey."

In the 1936 U.S. presidential election, The Literary Digest mailed out 10 million questionnaires, of which 2.4 million were returned.  Based on these, they predicted that Republican Alf Landon would win with 370 of 531 electoral votes, whereas he only got eight.   Research published in 1976 and 1988 concluded that non-response bias was the primary source of this error, although their sampling frame was also quite different from the vast majority of voters.
Non responders have been shown to be associated with younger patients, poorer communities and those who are less satisfied and subsequently could be a source of bias.

Test 
There are different ways to test for non-response bias. A common technique involves comparing the first and fourth quartiles of responses for differences in demographics and key constructs. In e-mail surveys some values are already known from all potential participants (e.g. age, branch of the firm, ...) and can be compared to the values that prevail in the subgroup of those who answered. If there is no significant difference this is an indicator that there might be no non-response bias.

In e-mail surveys those who didn't answer can also systematically be phoned and a small number of survey questions can be asked. If their answers don't differ significantly from those who answered the survey, there might be no non-response bias.  This technique is sometimes called non-response follow-up.

Generally speaking, the lower the response rate, the greater the likelihood of a non-response bias in play.

Related terminology
Self-selection bias is a type of bias in which individuals voluntarily select themselves into a group, thereby potentially biasing the response of that group.
Response bias is not the opposite of non-response bias, but instead relates to a possible tendency of respondents to give inaccurate or untruthful answers for various reasons.

See also
Selection bias

References

Further reading
 Special issue of Public Opinion Quarterly (Volume 70, Issue 5) about "Nonresponse Bias in Household Surveys": http://poq.oxfordjournals.org/content/70/5.toc
 

Survey methodology
Social research
Experimental bias